George Peter Kinyonga (? – December 24, 1992) was an influential musician in Kenya.

Born in Tanzania, Peter Kinyonga and his elder brother Wilson Kinyonga founded the rumba band Simba Wanyika which would later spawn Les Wanyika, Super Wanyika Stars and other offshoots. 

George and Wilson Kinyonga began as musicians in their home town Tanga in Tanzania when they joined Jamhuri Jazz Band in 1966. They moved to Arusha in 1970 and formed Arusha Jazz Band with their other brother, William Kinyonga. In 1970 they moved to Kenya and formed Simba Wanyika, which would become one of the most influential bands in the history of East African music.

External links
Simba Wanyika (BBC)
Simba Wanyika: Afropop Band

1992 deaths
Kenyan musicians
Tanzanian musicians
Year of birth missing
Tanzanian emigrants to Kenya